The 2022 Booker Prize was a literary award given for the best English novel of the year. It was announced on 17 October 2022, during a ceremony hosted by Sophie Duker at the Roundhouse in London. The longlist was announced on 26 July 2022. The shortlist was announced on 6 September. Leila Mottley, at 20, was the youngest longlisted writer to date, and Alan Garner, at 87, the oldest. The majority of the 13 titles were from independent publishers. The prize was awarded to Shehan Karunatilaka for his novel, The Seven Moons of Maali Almeida, receiving £50,000. He is the second Sri Lankan to win the prize, after Michael Ondaatje.

Judging panel
Neil MacGregor (chair)
Shahidha Bari
Helen Castor
M. John Harrison
Alain Mabanckou

Nominees

Shortlist

Longlist

See also
List of winners and shortlisted authors of the Booker Prize for Fiction

References

Man Booker
Booker Prizes by year
2022 awards in the United Kingdom